Peter McCracken (born 1 December 1949) is a former Australian rules footballer who played for the South Melbourne Football Club in the Victorian Football League (VFL).

References

External links 

Living people
1949 births
Australian rules footballers from Victoria (Australia)
Sydney Swans players